Barilius chatricensis is a fish in genus Barilius of the family Cyprinidae. It is found in India.

References 

C
Taxa named by Keishing Selim
Taxa named by Waikhom Vishwanath
Fish described in 2002
Freshwater fish of India
Cyprinid fish of Asia